Hypostomus luteus, also known in the pet trade as the golden sailfin pleco, is an armored catfish in the genus Hypostomus of the family Loricariidae. It is distinct due to its three phases of coloration that it goes through as it ages. It grows to a maximum size of 45 cm (18 in).

It is found in Northern Argentina in Rio Uruguay. It lives in fast-flowing waters where it mostly feeds on algae.

Phases of coloration 
Hypostomus Luteus goes through a significant change in color as it ages. In its first phase it has a dark brown to black body with yellow speckles all over its body. The fins are yellow. In the second phase the body gets a mix of yellow and black. The speckles fade away and the yellow starts to cover the whole body. In the third phase the entire body is gold. Not all Hypostomus Luteus reach full gold coloration and some specimens even start losing gold coloration after reaching the third phase.

Pet trade 
This species is caught in the wild and sold in the pet trade. Hobbyists keep them in ponds or aquariums. Although they are caught in the wild this does not significantly effect their population. The fish has become increasingly popular among experienced hobbyists in recent years. The fish is can be sold for upwards of $1000 for a third phase specimen.

In The Aquarium

Unlike most Loricariidae fish, Hypostomus Luteus should be kept in generally cooler waters of around 19–24 degrees Celsius or 67–75 degrees Fahrenheit. This is due to their native habitat, Rio Uruguay, having generally milder waters in comparison to the habitats of other Loricariidae species which are usually farther north.

References 

luteus
Fish of Uruguay
Taxa named by Carolina Godoy
Fish described in 1980